Menomen O'Donnell (April 20, 1830 – September 3, 1911) was an Irish American soldier and member of the 11th Missouri Volunteer Infantry who fought in the American Civil War and was awarded the Medal of Honor for placing his division's flag on the ramparts of an enemy fort during a battle in which he was injured twice.

References

1830 births
1911 deaths
Union Army soldiers
United States Army Medal of Honor recipients
American Civil War recipients of the Medal of Honor